Satchela Evrard Djedje (born 25 August 1992 in Orléans), better known by the artistic name Vegedream, is a French hip hop, R&B and urban pop singer-songwriter of Ivorian origin. He is signed to Universal Music France and is best known for his 2018 hit single Ramenez la coupe à la maison (Bring the cup back home) that topped the French SNEP Singles Chart, and was the France national football team's unofficial song for the 2018 FIFA World Cup. He released his debut studio album Marchand de sable (Sandman) in 2018. Since his breakthrough, he has released three studio albums, all of which reached the top 10 in the French Album Charts, as well as 23 singles, several of which also charted.

Personal life
Vegedream's father, as well as his uncle Ziké (also a musician), are from Gagnoa in the Ivory Coast, so in each song, he says (Et) ça c'est Vegedream de Gagnoa, meaning "(And) This is Vegedream from Gagnoa", which he got when he visited Gagnoa as a child. He is therefore also named "Vegedream de Gagnoa", as well as "Vege" and "Vegeta".

Discography

Studio albums

Singles

Featured singles
 "Un bail" (Neraah featuring Vegedream, 2017)
 "C'est la loi" (Naza featuring Vegedream, 2018)
 "Puerto Rico" (Shy'm featuring Vegedream, 2019)
 "Sors de ma vie" (Zayra featuring Vegedream, 2019)
 "Shaku" (KTL featuring Vegedream, 2020)
 "Kodo" (Elams featuring Vegedream)
 "Antoinetta" (Tom Moutchi featuring Vegedream, 2022)

Other charted songs

References

Notes

External links
Official website
page on Universal Music France website

21st-century French singers
French male singers
1992 births
Living people
Musicians from Orléans
French people of Ivorian descent
Black French musicians